Elections to Craigavon Borough Council were held on 30 May 1973 on the same day as the other Northern Irish local government elections. The election used four district electoral areas to elect a total of 25 councillors.

Election results

Districts summary

|- class="unsortable" align="centre"
!rowspan=2 align="left"|Ward
! % 
!Cllrs
! % 
!Cllrs
! %
!Cllrs
! %
!Cllrs
! % 
!Cllrs
! %
!Cllrs
!rowspan=2|TotalCllrs
|- class="unsortable" align="center"
!colspan=2 bgcolor="" | UUP
!colspan=2 bgcolor="" | Alliance
!colspan=2 bgcolor="" | Vanguard
!colspan=2 bgcolor="" | DUP
!colspan=2 bgcolor="" | SDLP
!colspan=2 bgcolor="white"| Others
|-
|align="left"|Area A
|bgcolor="40BFF5"|22.2
|bgcolor="40BFF5"|1
|14.7
|1
|0.0
|0
|13.8
|1
|17.7
|1
|20.9
|1
|5
|-
|align="left"|Area B
|bgcolor="40BFF5"|35.5
|bgcolor="40BFF5"|2
|21.7
|2
|19.8
|2
|8.1
|0
|0.0
|0
|14.9
|1
|7
|-
|align="left"|Area C
|bgcolor="40BFF5"|33.2
|bgcolor="40BFF5"|3
|16.2
|1
|18.9
|1
|5.5
|0
|14.3
|1
|11.9
|0
|6
|-
|align="left"|Area D
|bgcolor="40BFF5"|50.4
|bgcolor="40BFF5"|4
|11.0
|0
|20.0
|1
|18.6
|2
|0.0
|0
|0.0
|0
|7
|- class="unsortable" class="sortbottom" style="background:#C9C9C9"
|align="left"| Total
|36.9
|10
|16.0
|4
|16.0
|4
|11.6
|3
|6.7
|2
|12.8
|2
|25
|-
|}

Districts results

Area A

1973: 1 x SDLP, 1 x UUP, 1 x Alliance, 1 x DUP, 1 x Independent Nationalist

Area B

1973: 2 x UUP, 2 x Alliance, 2 x Vanguard, 1 x Independent Unionist

Area C

1973: 3 x UUP, 1 x SDLP, 1 x Alliance, 1 x Vanguard

Area D

1973: 4 x UUP, 2 x DUP, 1 x Vanguard

References

Craigavon Borough Council elections
Craigavon